The Ulyanovsk constituency (No.187) is a Russian legislative constituency in Ulyanovsk Oblast. In 1995-2007 the constituency covered the entirety of Ulyanovsk and its suburbs, however, in 2016 the constituency shedded some district of Ulyanovsk to rural Radishchevo constituency in exchange for eastern Ulyanovsk Oblast, including Dimitrovgrad.

Members elected

Election results

1993

|-
! colspan=2 style="background-color:#E9E9E9;text-align:left;vertical-align:top;" |Candidate
! style="background-color:#E9E9E9;text-align:left;vertical-align:top;" |Party
! style="background-color:#E9E9E9;text-align:right;" |Votes
! style="background-color:#E9E9E9;text-align:right;" |%
|-
|style="background-color:"|
|align=left|Valery Sychyov
|align=left|Independent
|
|52.39%
|-
|style="background-color:"|
|align=left|Amir Akhmetov
|align=left|Independent
| -
|12.20%
|-
| colspan="5" style="background-color:#E9E9E9;"|
|- style="font-weight:bold"
| colspan="3" style="text-align:left;" | Total
| 
| 100%
|-
| colspan="5" style="background-color:#E9E9E9;"|
|- style="font-weight:bold"
| colspan="4" |Source:
|
|}

1995

|-
! colspan=2 style="background-color:#E9E9E9;text-align:left;vertical-align:top;" |Candidate
! style="background-color:#E9E9E9;text-align:left;vertical-align:top;" |Party
! style="background-color:#E9E9E9;text-align:right;" |Votes
! style="background-color:#E9E9E9;text-align:right;" |%
|-
|style="background-color:"|
|align=left|Oleg Kazarov
|align=left|Independent
|
|25.94%
|-
|style="background-color:"|
|align=left|Vera Makhlova
|align=left|Our Home – Russia
|
|14.43%
|-
|style="background-color:#DD137B"|
|align=left|Sergey Svetunkov
|align=left|Social Democrats
|
|11.03%
|-
|style="background-color:"|
|align=left|Gennady Matveyev
|align=left|Independent
|
|8.13%
|-
|style="background-color:"|
|align=left|Nikolay Poddubny
|align=left|Communist Party
|
|7.59%
|-
|style="background-color:#2C299A"|
|align=left|Vasily Polishchuk
|align=left|Congress of Russian Communities
|
|7.05%
|-
|style="background-color:"|
|align=left|Aleksandr Kishkinev
|align=left|Liberal Democratic Party
|
|5.26%
|-
|style="background-color:#D50000"|
|align=left|Boris Gunko
|align=left|Communists and Working Russia - for the Soviet Union
|
|2.95%
|-
|style="background-color:#F21A29"|
|align=left|Viktor Sluzhivoy
|align=left|Trade Unions and Industrialists – Union of Labour
|
|2.95%
|-
|style="background-color:"|
|align=left|Nikolay Vasilyev
|align=left|Independent
|
|1.94%
|-
|style="background-color:#000000"|
|colspan=2 |against all
|
|9.60%
|-
| colspan="5" style="background-color:#E9E9E9;"|
|- style="font-weight:bold"
| colspan="3" style="text-align:left;" | Total
| 
| 100%
|-
| colspan="5" style="background-color:#E9E9E9;"|
|- style="font-weight:bold"
| colspan="4" |Source:
|
|}

1999

|-
! colspan=2 style="background-color:#E9E9E9;text-align:left;vertical-align:top;" |Candidate
! style="background-color:#E9E9E9;text-align:left;vertical-align:top;" |Party
! style="background-color:#E9E9E9;text-align:right;" |Votes
! style="background-color:#E9E9E9;text-align:right;" |%
|-
|style="background-color:"|
|align=left|Vadim Orlov
|align=left|Independent
|
|21.84%
|-
|style="background-color:"|
|align=left|Oleg Kazarov (incumbent)
|align=left|Communist Party
|
|15.89%
|-
|style="background-color:#3B9EDF"|
|align=left|Yury Polyanskov
|align=left|Fatherland – All Russia
|
|13.77%
|-
|style="background-color:"|
|align=left|Yury Stozharov
|align=left|Independent
|
|7.16%
|-
|style="background-color:"|
|align=left|Galina Smolyankina
|align=left|Independent
|
|5.26%
|-
|style="background-color:"|
|align=left|Lyudmila Tikhonova
|align=left|Our Home – Russia
|
|4.52%
|-
|style="background-color:"|
|align=left|Viktor Zharkov
|align=left|Independent
|
|4.36%
|-
|style="background-color:"|
|align=left|Anatoly Nechayev
|align=left|Yabloko
|
|4.23%
|-
|style="background-color:#FCCA19"|
|align=left|Vasily Polishchuk
|align=left|Congress of Russian Communities-Yury Boldyrev Movement
|
|2.66%
|-
|style="background-color:"|
|align=left|Valery Kozhevnikov
|align=left|Independent
|
|2.37%
|-
|style="background-color:#000000"|
|colspan=2 |against all
|
|15.54%
|-
| colspan="5" style="background-color:#E9E9E9;"|
|- style="font-weight:bold"
| colspan="3" style="text-align:left;" | Total
| 
| 100%
|-
| colspan="5" style="background-color:#E9E9E9;"|
|- style="font-weight:bold"
| colspan="4" |Source:
|
|}

2003
A by-election was scheduled after Against all line received the most votes.

|-
! colspan=2 style="background-color:#E9E9E9;text-align:left;vertical-align:top;" |Candidate
! style="background-color:#E9E9E9;text-align:left;vertical-align:top;" |Party
! style="background-color:#E9E9E9;text-align:right;" |Votes
! style="background-color:#E9E9E9;text-align:right;" |%
|-
|style="background-color:"|
|align=left|Galina Fedorova
|align=left|Independent
|
|9.65%
|-
|style="background-color:"|
|align=left|Anatoly Litvinov
|align=left|Independent
|
|9.17%
|-
|style="background-color:"|
|align=left|Aleksandr Kruglikov
|align=left|Communist Party
|
|9.13%
|-
|style="background-color:#FFD700"|
|align=left|Vadim Orlov (incumbent)
|align=left|People's Party
|
|8.97%
|-
|style="background-color:"|
|align=left|Yury Kogan
|align=left|Liberal Democratic Party
|
|8.16%
|-
|style="background-color:#00A1FF"|
|align=left|Tatyana Sergeyeva
|align=left|Party of Russia's Rebirth-Russian Party of Life
|
|7.90%
|-
|style="background:#1042A5"| 
|align=left|Sergey Gerasimov
|align=left|Union of Right Forces
|
|5.43%
|-
|style="background-color:"|
|align=left|Aleksandr Polyakov
|align=left|Independent
|
|5.29%
|-
|style="background-color:"|
|align=left|Igor Igin
|align=left|Independent
|
|5.17%
|-
|style="background-color:"|
|align=left|Nikolay Abramov
|align=left|Independent
|
|3.30%
|-
|style="background-color:"|
|align=left|Yevgeny Ofitserov
|align=left|Yabloko
|
|2.59%
|-
|style="background-color:"|
|align=left|Sergey Seryubin
|align=left|Independent
|
|1.17%
|-
|style="background-color:"|
|align=left|Yury Pimenov
|align=left|Independent
|
|1.12%
|-
|style="background-color:#164C8C"|
|align=left|Aleksandr Zhuravlev
|align=left|United Russian Party Rus'
|
|0.48%
|-
|style="background-color:#000000"|
|colspan=2 |against all
|
|19.76%
|-
| colspan="5" style="background-color:#E9E9E9;"|
|- style="font-weight:bold"
| colspan="3" style="text-align:left;" | Total
| 
| 100%
|-
| colspan="5" style="background-color:#E9E9E9;"|
|- style="font-weight:bold"
| colspan="4" |Source:
|
|}

2004 March
Another by-election was scheduled after Against all line received the most votes.

|-
! colspan=2 style="background-color:#E9E9E9;text-align:left;vertical-align:top;" |Candidate
! style="background-color:#E9E9E9;text-align:left;vertical-align:top;" |Party
! style="background-color:#E9E9E9;text-align:right;" |Votes
! style="background-color:#E9E9E9;text-align:right;" |%
|-
|style="background-color:"|
|align=left|Yury Goryachev
|align=left|Independent
|
|13.10%
|-
|style="background-color:"|
|align=left|Gennady Savinov
|align=left|Independent
|
|11.06%
|-
|style="background-color:"|
|align=left|Galina Fedorova
|align=left|Independent
|
|9.87%
|-
|style="background-color:"|
|align=left|Yury Kogan
|align=left|Liberal Democratic Party
|
|9.31%
|-
|style="background-color:"|
|align=left|Nikolay Abramov
|align=left|Independent
|
|7.37%
|-
|style="background-color:"|
|align=left|Sergey Gerasimov
|align=left|Independent
|
|7.36%
|-
|style="background-color:"|
|align=left|Raisa Baranova
|align=left|Independent
|
|6.26%
|-
|style="background-color:"|
|align=left|Igor Igin
|align=left|Independent
|
|5.12%
|-
|style="background-color:"|
|align=left|Aleksey Korniyenko
|align=left|Communist Party
|
|4.24%
|-
|style="background-color:"|
|align=left|Aleksandr Polyakov
|align=left|Independent
|
|1.93%
|-
|style="background-color:"|
|align=left|Viktor Naumenko
|align=left|Independent
|
|0.61%
|-
|style="background-color:"|
|align=left|Pavel Zverev
|align=left|Independent
|
|0.41%
|-
|style="background-color:#000000"|
|colspan=2 |against all
|
|21.50%
|-
| colspan="5" style="background-color:#E9E9E9;"|
|- style="font-weight:bold"
| colspan="3" style="text-align:left;" | Total
| 
| 100%
|-
| colspan="5" style="background-color:#E9E9E9;"|
|- style="font-weight:bold"
| colspan="4" |Source:
|
|}

2004 December

|-
! colspan=2 style="background-color:#E9E9E9;text-align:left;vertical-align:top;" |Candidate
! style="background-color:#E9E9E9;text-align:left;vertical-align:top;" |Party
! style="background-color:#E9E9E9;text-align:right;" |Votes
! style="background-color:#E9E9E9;text-align:right;" |%
|-
|style="background-color:"|
|align=left|Yury Kogan
|align=left|Liberal Democratic Party
|
|24.95%
|-
|style="background-color:"|
|align=left|Nikolay Abramov
|align=left|Independent
|
|20.16%
|-
|style="background-color:"|
|align=left|Galina Fedorova
|align=left|Independent
|
|14.55%
|-
|style="background-color:"|
|align=left|Vladimir Aladin
|align=left|Independent
|
|6.64%
|-
|style="background-color:"|
|align=left|Sergey Tagashyov
|align=left|Independent
|
|3.71%
|-
|style="background-color:"|
|align=left|Nikolay Smoroda
|align=left|Independent
|
|3.51%
|-
|style="background-color:"|
|align=left|Ilya Baskin
|align=left|Independent
|
|3.21%
|-
|style="background-color:"|
|align=left|Olga Bakhanova
|align=left|Independent
|
|2.68%
|-
|style="background-color:#000000"|
|colspan=2 |against all
|
|18.02%
|-
| colspan="5" style="background-color:#E9E9E9;"|
|- style="font-weight:bold"
| colspan="3" style="text-align:left;" | Total
| 
| 100%
|-
| colspan="5" style="background-color:#E9E9E9;"|
|- style="font-weight:bold"
| colspan="4" |Source:
|
|}

2016

|-
! colspan=2 style="background-color:#E9E9E9;text-align:left;vertical-align:top;" |Candidate
! style="background-color:#E9E9E9;text-align:left;vertical-align:top;" |Party
! style="background-color:#E9E9E9;text-align:right;" |Votes
! style="background-color:#E9E9E9;text-align:right;" |%
|-
|style="background-color:"|
|align=left|Alexey Kurinny
|align=left|Communist Party
|
|35.48%
|-
|style="background-color:"|
|align=left|Igor Tikhonov
|align=left|United Russia
|
|35.17%
|-
|style="background-color:"|
|align=left|Sergey Marinin
|align=left|Liberal Democratic Party
|
|9.18%
|-
|style="background:"| 
|align=left|Oleg Goryachev
|align=left|Yabloko
|
|6.92%
|-
|style="background-color:"|
|align=left|Aleksey Kulakov
|align=left|A Just Russia
|
|3.62%
|-
|style="background-color:"|
|align=left|Sergey Pronin
|align=left|Patriots of Russia
|
|2.34%
|-
|style="background:"| 
|align=left|Nikolay Klyushenkov
|align=left|Party of Growth
|
|1.77%
|-
|style="background-color: "|
|align=left|Vladimir Basenkov
|align=left|Rodina
|
|1.15%
|-
|style="background-color: "|
|align=left|Eduard Gebel
|align=left|People's Freedom Party
|
|1.00%
|-
| colspan="5" style="background-color:#E9E9E9;"|
|- style="font-weight:bold"
| colspan="3" style="text-align:left;" | Total
| 
| 100%
|-
| colspan="5" style="background-color:#E9E9E9;"|
|- style="font-weight:bold"
| colspan="4" |Source:
|
|}

2021

|-
! colspan=2 style="background-color:#E9E9E9;text-align:left;vertical-align:top;" |Candidate
! style="background-color:#E9E9E9;text-align:left;vertical-align:top;" |Party
! style="background-color:#E9E9E9;text-align:right;" |Votes
! style="background-color:#E9E9E9;text-align:right;" |%
|-
|style="background-color: " |
|align=left|Vladimir Kononov
|align=left|United Russia
|
|28.91%
|-
|style="background-color:"|
|align=left|Vitaly Kuzin
|align=left|Communist Party
|
|24.14%
|-
|style="background:"| 
|align=left|Mikhail Dolgov
|align=left|Communists of Russia
|
|12.42%
|-
|style="background-color:"|
|align=left|Dmitry Grachev
|align=left|Liberal Democratic Party
|
|7.84%
|-
|style="background-color: " |
|align=left|Valentina Nikonova
|align=left|New People
|
|6.19%
|-
|style="background-color: "|
|align=left|Andrey Ilgachev
|align=left|Party of Pensioners
|
|3.54%
|-
|style="background-color: "|
|align=left|Vasilisa Kiseleva
|align=left|Civic Platform
|
|3.26%
|-
|style="background-color:"|
|align=left|Olga Sevastyanova
|align=left|The Greens
|
|2.56%
|-
|style="background:"| 
|align=left|Yekaterina Tolchina
|align=left|Party of Growth
|
|1.65%
|-
|style="background:"| 
|align=left|Tatyana Molozina
|align=left|Russian Party of Freedom and Justice
|
|1.64%
|-
|style="background-color: "|
|align=left|Roman Milovanov
|align=left|Rodina
|
|1.56%
|-
| colspan="5" style="background-color:#E9E9E9;"|
|- style="font-weight:bold"
| colspan="3" style="text-align:left;" | Total
| 
| 100%
|-
| colspan="5" style="background-color:#E9E9E9;"|
|- style="font-weight:bold"
| colspan="4" |Source:
|
|}

Notes

References

Russian legislative constituencies
Politics of Ulyanovsk Oblast